BBC Shop is an online retailer owned by BBC Worldwide, the commercial arm of the BBC and operating in the US & Canada. It sells BBC Worldwide published products, and selected BBC-related products published by third parties, including DVDs, books, audiobooks, toys and clothing. It is self-funded and returns profits to the BBC to be reinvested in programmes and services.

Following the launch of BBC Store, a service that offers UK residents the opportunity to purchase, stream and download BBC programmes, the UK's physical and online shop closed  on 29 March 2016. However, the online shop in the US and Canada is still fully operating.

See also
BBC Store

References

External links
 BBC Shop US & Canada

Shop